Suaqui Grande Municipality is a municipality in Sonora in north-western Mexico.

The seat is Suaqui Grande.

The municipal area is 889.28 km2. and the population was 1,102 in 2000.

References

Municipalities of Sonora